The Equestrian Monument of Cosimo I is a bronze equestrian statue executed by Giambologna from 1587 to 1594, and erected in 1594 in the Piazza della Signoria in Florence, region of Tuscany, Italy.

History
This statue follows the Classical Roman tradition of Equestrian statues as the monument to a ruler's power, evident from the Statue of Marcus Aurelius in ancient Rome and the Regisole in Ferrara, and continued in the Renaissance by examples such as Donatello's Statue of Gattamelata (1453) in Padua and Verrocchio's Statue of Bartolomeo Colleoni (1488) in Venice.

This monument was commissioned by Cosimo's son Ferdinando I from the sculptor Giambologna, who also completed the Rape of the Sabines in the adjacent Loggia dei Lanzi. The Cosimo statue stands in front of the north corner of the Palazzo della Signoria, the northernmost of the row of statues, adjacent to the Fountain of Neptune (1563) by Ammannati, that had been commissioned by Cosimo himself. Together this duo celebrates the land and sea ambitions of Cosimo. The base of the statue has reliefs with scenes from the life of Cosimo, including his coronation in Rome as Grand-Duke in 1570 and his entrance into Siena as a ruler (1557) after his victory over that republic.

The posture of the trotting horse in this statue is similar to those of prior statues, with right leg raised, however unlike Marcus Aurelius, Cosimo uses stirrups and his horse shows the restraint of the bridle, albeit without much tension. Cosimo, like Gattemalata, holds a military baton, armor, and sheathed sword.

Some sources state the man and horse were cast separately, and the combined weight of the two was 23 thousand pounds. A few decades hence, Ferdinando I would have his own Equestrian monument in Piazza dell'Annunziata.

References

Cosimo
Monuments and memorials in Florence
Bronze sculptures in Florence
Outdoor sculptures in Florence
Sculptures by Giambologna
1590s sculptures
Statues of monarchs
Sculptures of men in Italy